Trough zithers are a group of African stringed instruments or chordophones whose members resemble wooden bowls, pans, platters, or shallow gutters with strings stretched across the opening. A type of zither, the instruments may be quiet, depending upon the shape of the bowl or string-holder. Sound is often amplified with the addition of a gourd resonator. Instruments have been classed into five different types, based on shape.

The resonator is most commonly a gourd, but tin cans have also been used.

An instrument of East and Central Africa, mainly Rwanda and Burundi. Parts of the Democratic Republic of Congo and Tanzania as well, near the borders with Rwanda and Burundi.

Playing

Inanga
The musician plays the inanga with both hands. The instrument is rested in the player's lap or beside them on the left side. Holding the top of the instrument with the left little-finger, the player plucks the instrument's topmost strings with the hand's other fingers. The right had plucks the bottom strings, that have the lowest notes.

Inanga Burundi of Burundi plays with a different technique. He sits the instrument on his lap facing away from him. He plays the bottom strings from the side with one hand, and reaches from above with the other to play the top strings, supporting the instrument with his forearm.

He has also been taped laying the instrument flat on a table, reaching across with both hands from the top, plucking the strings.

The instruments are not used to play chords. A rhythmic, melodic pattern is played and repeated. Singing is done over the playing. While the instruments are tuned before playing, notes can be raised while playing, by pressing down on the end of a string while plucking with the other hand.

There are traditions in each tribe for who may play the instrument. For instance, among the Kunta and Ziba, men played the instrument, while among the Hima it was women who played the instrument. Among the Kiba, men were the main musicians but women also played the instrument.

Ligombo
A picture by Ulrich Wegner shows the Ligombo being played. The musician held the instrument so that it faced him, plucking (probably) the strings with his thumbs. The instrument's resonating gourd could also be used as a rhythm instrument; Wegner said if that the second person in the photo was "accompanying him rhythmically on the resonator" with his bare hands.

Nanga
One way the Acholi play the instrument is as a fast rhythmic instrument, laying down a repetitive melodic beat for dancers. Sitting on the ground, the musician's pluck the strings with their thumbs.

Characteristics
The body or bowl of the instrument may be a shallow platter, like the Inanga; however can also be large and deep enough to be a baby's cradle. Instruments are usually made from a single price of wood with slots in the ends. Overall shape may be cylindrical or rectangular.

Strings were historically of natural materials, such as vegetable fibers or "cow sinew". One long piece of string is put through the holes or in the notches, back and forth from end to end, creating segments of individual strings.

The ends of the string may be held in place, wrapped around a wooden peg, anchoring the string. The string is tuned by tightening or loosening it; the process involves several string segments, because as a segment is adjusted, it affects those it is connected to.

The "sharp, sawtooth notches" help control the tension on the string, gripping and holding the string. Additionally, a wooden stick can be used to adjust string tension, by wedging it under strings at each end.

Some instruments have holes instead of carved notches.

Gourds may be affixed to the bottom of an instrument by tying it through holes on the side or bottom of the instrument down into holes in the gourd. The gourd acts as a resonator to improve sound. The bottom of the bowl may also have soundholes. As the zither wood dries and ages, it may crack; these cracks have been repaired by bracing the halves together with tin and nails, or by wrapping the instrument with cord and tightening the halves together.

Types
Ulrich Wegner (1984) divides the East African shell zithers into five groups according to their shape.

Type A
The inanga of the intermediate lake area with a wide, flat bowl shape and low edges belongs to type A. In this case, a single string of strings is run continuously around notches on the rounded narrow sides.

Type B
The ligombo of type B is characterized by a very narrow, flat shape that tapers towards the middle of the sides. The string is fed through holes on the narrow sides. Apart from the Hehe, this type comes from the Wakinga in the Njombe Region in southern Tanzania, the Sangu in the Mbeya Region in the southwest, the Bena in the Iringa Region and among the Kaguru in the eastern center of the country.

A shorter version of the ligombo with seven strings among the Safwa who live in the territory of the Sangu in the Mbeya Region is called sumbi.

Type C
Type C differs from the otherwise similar type B in that it has a deeper semi-tubular shape and straight longitudinal walls. It occurs north of the distribution area of type B especially among the Gogo in the central Tanzanian region of Dodoma, among the Turu in the Singida Region, with the Sandawe in the Kondoa District and the Isanzu in Iramba district (Singida Region).

Type D
Type D is again long and narrow, but has a flat bottom and straight side walls at right angles to it. Its distribution area is along the east coast with the Zaramo and Kwere in the Pwani Region and further south with the Makonde.

Type E
Among the Makonde and Nguru (Ngulu) speakers in eastern central Tanzania, the type E with a wide rectangular bowl shape and a flat bottom was also observed.

Distribution 
Trough zithers are an African innovation. In East Africa they occur all over Tanzania and in the inter-lake area (between Lake Victoria, Lake Kivu and Lake Tanganyika), Uganda, Rwanda, Burundi, and eastern Congo.

List of historical trough zithers
This list of trough zithers attempts to match names of known trough zithers with people or places associated with trough zithers under those names. In some cases, information is less specific than in original sources. A source might name a particular ethnicity in a particular place, but this list doesn't keep the two together. An example: the Hutu's of Rwanda are listed as playing the inanga. It is possible that not all Hutu groups everywhere play the Inanga, nor do all ethnic groups in Rwanda play the instrument.

Another consideration, names. The names on the list were recorded by people who collected the instrument in the field, or by people who bought the instrument. Accuracy might be an issue. Furthermore, if the names were recorded correctly, the name given might need to be looked at; for example a name might refer to a specific instrument or to all string instruments or to instruments in general. One group may use the same name differently than another groups. For example Ngombi can refer either to a Zande trough zither or to a harp (by the Pygmies, Mbaka, Isongo, Ngbaka, Mitshogho and Fang), a lamellaphone by the Gbandi, or a slit drum by the Boa.

Traditions change. The information here was compiled from museum collections and 20th-century books.

See also
Ligombo on German Wikipedia
Segankuru on German Wikipedia

External links
Type B trough zither
Type B trough zither
Type B trough zither
Type C trough zither, Tanzania.
Type C trough zither, from the Wagogogo or Gogo people, Tanzania.
Type C trough zither, Rwanda
Type C trough zither
Type D Trough zither
Type D trough zither
Ligombo, a type D trough zither, Hehe culture.
Type E trough zither from Malawi.
Page with photos of Tanzanian trough zithers, labeled by peoples, including Gogo, Hehe, Kaguru, Luguru, Zaramo, Kwere, and Zigua.
Sandawe people, trough zither in the British Museum, Kondoa (District), Dodoma (region)
Acholi people, record of a trough zither acquired by the British Museum
Isese people, trough zither in the British Museum, from Tanzania
Kamanga people, Malawi.
Zigua people, Tanzania

References 

Zithers
African musical instruments
Burundian musical instruments
Rwandan musical instruments
Ugandan musical instruments
Tanzanian musical instruments
Botswana musical instruments
Malawian musical instruments
Nigerian musical instruments
Democratic Republic of the Congo musical instruments